EastEnd Cabaret is a musical comedy cabaret character duo based in London, England, formed in late 2009.

History

The first incarnation of EastEnd Cabaret was in November 2009 at the iconic East End pub owned by artist Pauline Forster, The George Tavern. The show was called Bernadette Byrne (Bernie Dieter) and the EastEnd Cabaret, and took the form of a cabaret revue, featuring singers, poets and comedians.

EastEnd Cabaret created and curated "The Attic" in December 2010, a pop-up cabaret bar in an illegal squat in Soho. The building (which once housed the Limelight Club, famed in the 1980s for celebrity nightclubbers including Prince) was taken over by art squatters The Oubliette Arthouse.

In 2011, in an article on the London cabaret scene, the duo was named as one of Time Out magazine's Top Ten "Cabaret Superstars".

Other media

Television
EastEnd Cabaret filmed two of their songs for the third season of Live at the Electric, BBC Three's comedy variety show hosted by comedian Russell Kane. The episodes were screened in early 2014. They also appeared on ABC2 in 2014 for Comedy Up Late, a live variety show featuring the best of the Melbourne International Comedy Festival.

Radio

EastEnd Cabaret appeared on BBC Radio 1's Edinburgh Fringe programme, "Fun and Filth Cabaret" in 2012. Hosted by Nick Grimshaw, it streamed on radio and YouTube.
In June 2011, the duo appeared on BBC London's Late Night Show with Joanne Good, performing "Is It in Yet" (a song recounting Bernadette's attempt to deflower three different virgins) to a shocked host, but delighted listeners.

EastEnd Cabaret have also performed live on 3 JOY's programme The Cabaret Room with Paul Williamson in Melbourne, as well as on Sundays with Libbi Gorr on 774 ABC Melbourne, Fresh Air, SAFM and 891 ABC Adelaide.

Online and elsewhere
EastEnd Cabaret's use of online marketing tools was one of the aspects highlighted by judges of The Hospital Club hClub100 award. The music video for their original song, "Dangerwank", filmed and edited by Triple A Films, has had over 28,000 hits to date.

References

External links
Official Website
EastEnd Cabaret on YouTube

British cabaret performers
English comedy musicians